Kooky Tuason is a spoken word artist/advocate and educator. She has 7 Spoken Word albums - Romancing Venus 1, Romancing Venus 2, Bigkas Pilipinas , In Transit: Manila x Toronto , Southversive, Bigkas Pilipinas on JAM 88.3 Vol 1 and Bigkas Pilipinas on JAM 88.3 Vol 2. She hosted the first and only Spoken Word radio show at Jam 88.3 in the Philippines, "Bigkas Pilipinas" from 2007 to 2009. Her show was nominated at the KBP Golden Dove Awards and Catholic Mass Media Awards for Best Culture and Arts Program. She also performed her Spoken Word track Holdap from the album Bigkas Pilipinas in indie film Rome and Juliet. She launched her online channel Thinking Man's Classroom on February 16, 2015, an educational channel that aims to awaken the creative within. Her shows include a spoken word show "For Word and By Word", a philosophical debate/talk show "Principals of Principle", a dark storytelling show "A Museum of Randomly Perfected Broken Bodies", a show for geeks "Random Fandom", a show on the art scene and artists in the Philippines "Art Is", an intellectual drama series "Eden", a show on languages "Pass the Message" and a show on mentalism "Mind Over Matter". Her coffee table book Picket Lines : Dialogues between Eves, among Eves and for Eves was launched on March 5, 2015, and aims to empower women with the one line statements written on the models bodies. Kooky Tuason was featured in Manila Bulletin's Women of 2015, Lifestyle section and Philippine Daily Inquirer's Super Section "A woman's way with Words". She had an online radio channel to inspire and empower women called Romancing Venus Radio. She has performed at The Hyderabad Literary Festival, Hyderabad, India, Kalinga Literary Festival, Bhubaneswar, India, ASEAN Literary Festival, Jakarta, Indonesia among others. She has 2 graphic novels under her belt, Eve of the Grey and The House on Road No 10. After a long hiatus, Kooky is again hosting Bigkas Pilipinas on JAM 88.3, Tuesdays Midnight to 2AM. She also has an all women podcast channel "Venus in Orbit" and has a show on introverts called "Soul'o Flight". She also gives tips to introverts on her YouTube channel. She now has her own record label, Bigkas Pilipinas Records, focused on Philippine poetry.

External links
Agimat profile
IMDB
gmanetwork
Premiere Launch of the Spoken Word Album "In:Transit Manila x Toronto"
A delightful medley of Phillipino [sic] poetry, dance and music | Hyderabad News - Times of India
ASEAN Literary Festival taking the road 'beyond imagination'
Soul’O Flight Episode Guide (Page 6) – Venus In Orbit
Kooky Tuason - YouTube
Mindanao poet Gerald Castillo Galindez releases debut Poetry EP ‘From Kabacan-Buluan-Tacurong, With Love’

Spoken word artists
Year of birth missing (living people)
Living people